Sediminibacterium aquarii is a Gram-negative, rod-shaped and strictly aerobic  bacterium from the genus of Sediminibacterium which has been isolated from sediments from a fish bowl.

References

External links
Type strain of Sediminibacterium aquarii at BacDive -  the Bacterial Diversity Metadatabase

Chitinophagia
Bacteria described in 2016